The 2016 Coppa Italia Final decided the winner of the 2015–16 Coppa Italia, the 69th season of Italy's main football cup. It was played on 21 May 2016 at the Stadio Olimpico in Rome, between rivals Milan and Juventus.

Since Juventus won the 2015–16 Serie A, Milan secured their place in the 2016 Supercoppa Italiana. Juventus won the match 1–0 after extra time, with a 110th-minute goal by the substitute Álvaro Morata with his first touch, successfully defending their title.

Background
Milan played in a final for the 13th time, of which they have won five. Their most recent final was in 2003, defeating Roma 6–3 on aggregate. It was Juventus' second consecutive final and the 16th in their history, second only to Roma's 17. They had won a record ten titles. They were the title holders when they defeated Lazio 2–1 after extra time in the last year's final.

Milan and Juventus contested in three finals. Juventus won twice, the first was in 1942 after the final ended with a 1–1 draw, they won 4–1 in replay, the second was in 1990 with a 1–0 victory on aggregate. Milan won 6–3 on penalties after a 1–1 draw in 1973.

Road to the final
Note: In all results below, the score of the finalist is given first (H: home; A: away).

Match

Team selection
Juventus were without defender Leonardo Bonucci, who was given a yellow card in both legs of the semi-final. They also missed Claudio Marchisio who suffered a torn cruciate ligament in his left knee, that sidelined him for nearly six months.

Details

References

Coppa Italia Finals
2015–16 in Italian football cups
Football in Rome
Coppa Italia Final 2016
Coppa Italia Final 2016
Coppa Italia Final 2016
Coppa Italia
Sports competitions in Rome